Karelia Brigade (Finnish: Karjalan Prikaati, KARPR) is one of the three Finnish Army readiness brigades. It is currently based at Valkeala. With some three thousand soldiers it is the second largest brigade in Finland. It is the only Finnish brigade providing training in all Army branches and houses the Finnish Defence Forces Explosive Ordnance Disposal Centre of Excellence. , the brigade is under the command of Brigadier General Jukka Jokinen after Brigadier General Pasi Välimäki, who served as commander until August 2019, was promoted to Lieutenant general.

History

The present Karelia Brigade was founded on 1 January 1957 by renaming the 5th Brigade. The lineage of the brigade hails back to the Winter War 13th Division, which formed the 8th Brigade during the Interim Peace. During the Continuation War, the brigade formed Infantry Regiment 8. Following the Lapland War, the regiment became a garrison unit in Kouvola, where it was renamed the 5th Brigade in 1952.

Heraldry and traditions

The brigade keeps the traditions of the Regiment of the Karelian Guard, which was formed in 1918 from three other regiments. The brigade anniversary is on 6 May, commemorating the 1618 order by Gustavus Adolphus of Sweden to found the Regiment of Karelia.

It consists of the Finnish coat of arms in the middle of an open laurel wreath. Each of the corners are decorated with the dueling arms from the coat of arms of the Province of Karelia with crowns. The flag is carried on a pole with the Cross of Liberty as a finial, and ribbons of the Cross of Liberty 4th Class. The ribbons are embroudered with names of locations where the original regiment saw combat during the Finnish Civil War.

The brigade insignia consists of the dueling arms of the coat of arms of the Province of Karelia on a laurel wreath. As with the flag, the insignia belonged originally to the Regiment of the Karelian Guard, and was assigned to the brigade in 1967.

It is a cross of white and red, with a golden brigade insignia in the middle. The colors stem from those used by the officers of the Regiment of the Karelian Guard on their shoulder marks.

The brigade march is the old march of the 8th Viipuri Sharpshooter Battalion. It was composed by Eduard Dupuy and arranged by Uuno Kuparinen.

Composition (Peace time)

Kymi Jaeger Battalion (Kymen Jääkäripataljoona, KYMJP)
1st Mechanized Jaeger Company (1. Panssarijääkärikomppania)
2nd Mechanized Jaeger Company (2. Panssarijääkärikomppania)
3rd Mechanized Jaeger Company (3. Panssarijääkärikomppania)
Karelia Artillery Regiment (Karjalan Tykistörykmentti, KARTR)
1st Field Artillery Battery (1. Kenttätykistöpatteri)
2nd Field Artillery Battery (2. Kenttätykistöpatteri)
Mortar Company (Kranaatinheitinkomppania)
Salpausselkä Air Defense Battalion (Salpausselän Ilmatorjuntapatteristo, SALPITPSTO)
1st Air Defense Battery (1. Ilmatorjuntapatteri)
2nd Air Defense Battery (2. Ilmatorjuntapatteri)
3rd Air Defense Battery (3. Ilmatorjuntapatteri)
Kymi Engineer Battalion (Kymen Pioneeripataljoona, KYMPIONP)
1st Engineer Company (1. Pioneerikomppania)
2nd Engineer Company (2. Pioneerikomppania)
EOD Company (Raivaajakomppania)
East Finland Signal Battalion (Itä-Suomen Viestipataljoona, I-SVP)
HQ Company (Esikuntakomppania)
1st Signals Company (1. Viestikomppania)
2nd Signals Company (2. Viestikomppania)
Karelia Logistics Battalion (Karjalan Huoltopataljoona, KARHP)
1st Supply Company (1. Huoltokomppania)
2nd  Supply Company (2. Huoltokomppania)
Materiel Centre (Materiaalikeskus)
Maintenance Centre (Kunnossapitokeskus)
Transportation Centre (Kuljetuskeskus)
Driving School (Autokoulu)

References

External links
Puolustusvoimat: Karjalan Prikaati (In Finnish)

Brigades of Finland
Kouvola